Karan is a small town and urban commune in the Koulikoro Region of southwestern Mali. In the 2009 census the commune had a population of 6,874.

References

Communes of Koulikoro Region